The Friends Burial Ground, also called Temple Hill Burial Ground or the Friends Sleeping Place is a Quaker burial ground located at Temple Hill, Blackrock, Dublin. It opened in 1860 and is one of only two Quaker burial grounds in Dublin; the other being at Cork Street.

History
Before this burial ground opened, there were two other burial grounds in Dublin. One in Cork Street and the other located off St. Stephen's Green on York Street. The ground on York Street was sold in 1805 for the building of the Royal College of Surgeons. Today there is nothing to be seen of this old burial ground.  The Cork Street burial ground, which dates from the 1690s, is located beside the James Weir Home for Nurses, opposite the old Cork Street Fever Hospital.

All the gravestones in the burial ground are uniform in size and are inscribed with only the names and dates of who they are for. This is in keeping with the Quaker rules for interment.

It is noted that some of the Quaker families interred here are Allen, Grubb, Fairbrother, Goodbody, Pim, Todhunter, Sparrow Walpole and Waring. The burial grounds are under the care of the Dublin Monthly Meeting of the Religious Society of Friends in Ireland.

Notable burials
Sir John Barrington (1824–1887), MP and Lord Mayor of Dublin in 1865 and 1879
Jonathan Pim (1806–1885), founding member and president of the Dublin Statistical Society
Lydia Shackleton (1828–1914), Irish botanical artist
Alfred Webb (1834–1908), Irish Parliamentary Party politician, Member of Parliament, biographer and publisher
Horace Walpole (1880–1964), damask and linen manufacturer
John Richardson Wigham (1829–1906), lighthouse engineer and inventor
Anna Haslam (1829–1922), women's rights activist

References

External links
Quakers in Ireland

Cemeteries in Dún Laoghaire–Rathdown
Quakerism